Cortina d'Ampezzo Olympics
1944 Winter Olympics VI Olympic Winter Games (suspended for World War II)
1956 Winter Olympics IV Olympic Winter Games
2026 Winter Olympics XXV Olympic Winter Games, jointly with Milan